Dame Dorothy Mary Rees  (29 July 189820 August 1987) was a Labour Party politician in the United Kingdom, and was briefly a Member of Parliament (MP).

Career 
Rees was a schoolteacher in South Wales and a member of Barry Borough Council, and an alderman of Glamorgan County Council. At the 1950 general election, she was elected as MP for the constituency of Barry, but lost her seat at the 1951 general election to the Conservative Raymond Gower. In Parliament, she served as Parliamentary Private Secretary (PPS) to Edith Summerskill, the Minister of National Insurance.

She served as a member of the National advisory committee for National Insurance, the Joint Education Committee for Wales, Welsh Teaching Hospitals Board, and was awarded a CBE in 1964, and a DBE in 1975.

References



1898 births
1987 deaths
Welsh schoolteachers
Dames Commander of the Order of the British Empire
Welsh Labour Party MPs
Female members of the Parliament of the United Kingdom for Welsh constituencies
People from Glamorgan
UK MPs 1950–1951
Barry, Vale of Glamorgan
Members of Glamorgan County Council
20th-century British women politicians
Women councillors in Wales